FERT (sometimes tripled, FERT, FERT, FERT), the motto of the royal house of Savoy-Sardinia and Italy, the House of Savoy, was adopted by Duke Vittorio Amedeo II (1666–1732).

It appeared for the first time on the collar of the Supreme Order of the Most Holy Annunciation, or Ordine Supremo della Santissima Annunziata, the primary dynastic order of the kingdom. This ceased to be a national order when Italy became a republic in 1946. The order remains under the jurisdiction of the head of the House of Savoy, however, as hereditary Sovereign and Grand Master.

The meaning of the letters has been a matter of some controversy, to which a number of interpretations have been offered. The motto is believed an acronym of:

  (Latin: 'Treaty and religion bind us');
  (Latin: 'His strength conquered Rhodes' or 'By his bravery he held [or occupied] Rhodes'), referring to the victory of Amadeus V, Count of Savoy (1249–1323), who fought against the Saracens at the 1315 siege of Rhodes; or either
  (Latin: 'His bravery [or strength] preserves [or defends] the state'); or 
  (Latin: 'Faith is the protector of [our] Kingdom').

It has also been suggested that the letters are actually the Latin word  (third-person singular present active indicative of ), meaning '[he/she/it] suffers/bears', possibly referring to Jesus bearing the sins of the world.

See also
A.E.I.O.U. – another motto of a European dynasty (the House of Habsburg) whose precise meaning and origin is unclear

References 

House of Savoy
Initialisms
National symbols of Italy
National mottos
Mottoes of orders of chivalry
Duchy of Savoy
Latin mottos